This is a list of conflicts in Somaliland, including wars, armed rebellions, battles and skirmishes that took place within Somaliland. It encompasses colonial wars, wars of independence, secessionist and separatist conflicts, major episodes of national violence (riots, massacres, etc.), and global conflicts in which Somaliland was a theatre of war.

Medieval times

Adal Sultanate
1529 C.E. – 1543 C.E. Ethiopian–Adal War
April 4, 1542 C.E. – April 16, 1542 C.E. Battle of Jarte

Modern times

Isaaq Sultanate 
1825 – 1827 C.E. Battle of Berbera

Dervish movement
1881 C.E. – 1920 C.E. Scramble for Africa
1900 C.E. – 1920 C.E. Somaliland Campaign
January 1920 C.E. – February 1920 C.E. Somaliland campaign
July 28, 1914 C.E. – November 11, 1918 C.E. World War I
August 3, 1914 C.E. – November 23, 1918 C.E. African theatre
August 3, 1914 C.E. – November 1918 C.E. East African Campaign

British Somaliland
February 25, 1922 C.E. – Late March 1922 C.E. Burao Tax Revolt
July 2, 1945 C.E. - July 7, 1945 C.E. 1945 Sheikh Bashir Rebellion

Italian East Africa
June 10, 1940 C.E. – November 27, 1941 C.E. World War II
June 10, 1940 C.E. – May 2, 1945 C.E. Mediterranean and Middle East theatre
June 10, 1940 C.E. – November 27, 1941 C.E. East African Campaign
August 3, 1940 C.E. – August 19, 1940 C.E. Italian conquest of British Somaliland

Somali Republic
July 13, 1977 C.E. – March 15, 1978 C.E. Ethio—Somali War
April 6, 1981 C.E. - May 18, 1991 C.E. Somaliland War of Independence
June 1982 C.E. – August 1982 C.E. Ethiopian–Somali Border War
1986 C.E. – 1991 C.E. Somali Rebellion

Somaliland
1998 C.E. – ongoing Puntland-Somaliland dispute

See also
Somaliland Armed Forces
Somaliland Navy
Military history of Africa
African military systems to 1,800 C.E.
African military systems 1,800 C.E. — 1,900 C.E.
African military systems after 1,900 C.E.

Somaliland history-related lists
Military history of Somaliland